Palmichal is a district of the Acosta canton, in the San José province of Costa Rica.

Geography 
Palmichal has an area of  km² and an elevation of  metres.

Tabarcia River, one of the main tributaries of Parrita River basin, originates at the mountains of San Pablo town, located in this district. This water springs of San Pablo are a relevant tourist attraction in Palmichal district, along with coffee and citric plantations nearby.

Demographics 

For the 2011 census, Palmichal had a population of  inhabitants.

Transportation

Road transportation 
The district is covered by the following road routes:
 National Route 209

References 

Districts of San José Province
Populated places in San José Province